Jeonbuk Science High School (JBSH; Korean: 전북과학고등학교; Hanja: 全北科學高等學敎) is a science high school located in Iksan, North Jeolla Province, South Korea.

History 
 The school was established on 1 March 1991 with Choi Byeung Sun as the first president.

Entrance
 There is an entrance test annually in October.
 Top 3% grade students in Middle School (Equivalent to GCSE in the U.K.) can apply Jeonbuk Science High School.

Events
 The music festival Starry Night is held annually in July.
 The winter festival Han Gyeol Festival is held annually in December.
 The school year book Gyeol is published annually in December.
 The school newspaper Newton & Shakespeare is published every three months.
 The school Science Thesis competition is held in December.

References 
The information in this article is based on that in its Korean equivalent.

External links 
 Official website

Science high schools in South Korea
Educational institutions established in 1991
1991 establishments in South Korea